Muthukadu is a village in the Annavasal revenue block of Pudukkottai district, Tamil Nadu, India.

Demographics 

As per the 2001 census, Muthukadu had a total population of 3040 with 1512 males and 1528 females. Out of the total population, 2009 people were literate.

References

Villages in Pudukkottai district